John Denis Springall (19 September 1932 – 26 June 2020) was an English first-class cricketer. He played in 121 matches for Nottinghamshire between 1955 and 1963, and returned for a single List A cricket match in 1967.

A middle-order batsman, Springall had his most successful season in 1959, when he scored 1488 runs at an average of 35.42 and hit his only first-class centuries: 107 not out against Leicestershire and 100 not out against Northamptonshire. He also had his best return with his medium-pace bowling in 1959, with 6 for 43 against Surrey. From 1964 to 1967, he played for Walkden in the Central Lancashire League.

References

1932 births
2020 deaths
People from Southwark
English cricketers
Nottinghamshire cricketers
Marylebone Cricket Club cricketers